Jana Novotná and Arantxa Sánchez Vicario were the defending champions, but none competed this year.

Gigi Fernández and Natasha Zvereva won the title by defeating Gabriela Sabatini and Brenda Schultz 6–1, 6–3 in the final.

Seeds
The first four seeds received a bye to the second round.

Draw

Finals

Top half

Bottom half

References

External links
 Official results archive (ITF)
 Official results archive (WTA)

Italian Open - Womens Doubles, 1994
1994 Italian Open (tennis)